Parastratiosphecomyia is a genus of flies in the family Stratiomyidae.

Species
Parastratiosphecomyia freidbergi Woodley, 2012
Parastratiosphecomyia rozkosnyi Woodley, 2012
Parastratiosphecomyia stratiosphecomyioides Brunetti, 1923
Parastratiosphecomyia szechuanensis Lindner, 1954

References

Gallery

Stratiomyidae
Brachycera genera
Taxa named by Enrico Adelelmo Brunetti
Diptera of Asia